Charles Acheampong is a Ghanaian politician and member of the Eighth Parliament of the Fourth Republic of Ghana representing the Lower West Akim Constituency in the Eastern Region on the ticket of the New Patriotic Party. He is currently a board member of the Ghana News Agency.

Early life and education 
Acheampong was born on 9 May 1981 and hails from Osenase in the Eastern region. He had his Masters degree in Wireless Communication in 2012.

Career 
Acheampong was the manager of the National Communications Authority.

Political career 
Acheampong is a member of NPP and currently the MP for the Lower Akim West Constituency in the Eastern region. In the 2020 Ghana general elections, he won the parliamentary seat with 27,527 votes whilst the NDC parliamentary aspirant Micheal Adu-Sei had 19,744 votes and the GUM parliamentary aspirant Baidoo Seth Nicholas Kwame had 464 votes.

Committees 
Acheampong is a member of the Public Accounts Committee and also a member of Communications Committee.

Personal life 
Acheampong is a Christian.

References 

Living people
Ghanaian MPs 2021–2025
New Patriotic Party politicians
1981 births
People from Eastern Region (Ghana)
Ghanaian politicians
21st-century Ghanaian politicians